This is a list in alphabetical order of Argentine cricketers who have played first-class cricket. The period 1900 to 1939 is considered the golden years of Argentine cricket, with many Argentine cricketers being of county standard and the national team playing 13 first-class matches during this period. During this period several Argentine cricketers played first-class cricket in England for county sides. No Argentine cricketer has played first-class cricket since Jack Mendl in 1957.

The details are the player's usual name followed by the years in which he was active as a first-class player and then his name is given as it would appear on modern match scorecards. Note that many players represented other first-class teams besides Argentina. Players are shown to the end of the 2021 season.

A
Cecil Ayling (1937/38) : C. D. Ayling
Cyril Ayling (1937/38) : C. E. Ayling
Dennet Ayling (1926/27–1937/38) : E. N. D. Ayling

B
 A. E. Best (1926/27–1929/30)
 Harry Biedermann (1911/12) : H. E. C. Biedermann
 Charles Brook (1926/27) : C. W. Brook
 Geoffrey Brooke-Taylor (1919–1929/30) : G. P. Brooke-Taylor
 Gordon Brown (1911/12) : G. G. Brown
 Frank Bryans (1926/27–1929/30) : F. A. Bryans
  K. S. Bush (1937/38)

C
 John Campbell (1911/12) : J. A. Campbell
 Wilfred Cowes (1926/27) : W. A. Cowes
 Austen Cowper (1908–1924/25) : S. A. Cowper
 O. T. Cunningham (1926/27)

D
 Herbert Dorning (1911/12–1929/30) : H. Dorning
 Gerald Drysdale (1911/12) : G. C. Drysdale

F
 George Ferguson (1929/30–1937/38) : G. W. Ferguson
 Philip Foy (1911/12–1930) : F. A. Foy

G
 William Gardom (1911/12) : W. D. C. Gardom
 Harold Garnett (1899–1914) : H. G. Garnett
 Clement Gibson (1919–1939) : C. H. Gibson
 James Gifford (1897–1898) : J. Gifford

H
 Kenneth Henderson (1926/27–1929/30) : K. Henderson
 Charles Horsfall (1911/12) : C. M. Horsfall

J
 Alfred Jackson (1932–1937/38) : A. L. S. Jackson
 Neville Jackson (1911/12) : N. W. Jackson
 Arnold Jacobs (1932) : A. L. Jacobs

K
 Frederick Keen (1926/27–1932) : F. F. Keen
 John Knox (1926/27–1937/38) : J. Knox
 R. P. R. Ker (1937/38)

L
 de Courcy Lyons (1926/27–1929/30) : d. C. Lyons

M
 Henry Marshal (1926/27–1929/30) : H. W. Marshal
 Peter McRae (1936–1939) : F. M. McRae
 Derek Mendl (1951) : D. F. Mendl
 Jack Mendl (1949–1957) : J. F. Mendl

O
Rollo O'Dwyer (1929/30) : R. G. O'Dwyer

P
James Paul (1926/27–1935) : J. H. Paul

R
 Robert Rudd (1911/12) : R. W. Rudd
 C. P. Russ (1911/12)

S
 J. B. Sheridan (1911/12)
 Gerard Simpson (1911/12–1931) : G. A. Simpson
 George Stocks (1937/38) : G. W. Stocks
 Robert Stuart (1929/30–1937/38) : R. L. Stuart
 Stanley Sylvester (1937/38) : S. M. F. Sylvester

T
 Evelyn Toulmin (1899–1912) : E. M. O. Toulmin

V
 Charlie Vignoles (1937/38) : C. L. Vignoles

W
 Arnold Watson Hutton (1911/12) : A. P. W. Hutton
 Thomas Wesley-Smith (1926/27) : T. Wesley-Smith
 Charles Whaley (1911/12) : C. H. Whaley

Notes

References

Cricket in Argentina